Savannah Clark Guthrie (born December 27, 1971) is an Australian-born American broadcast journalist and attorney. She is a main co-anchor of the NBC News, morning show Today, a position she has held since July 2012.

Guthrie joined NBC News in September 2007 as a legal analyst and correspondent, regularly reporting on trials throughout the country. After serving as a White House correspondent between 2008 and 2011 and as co-anchor of the MSNBC program The Daily Rundown in 2010 and 2011, Guthrie was announced as the co-host of Todays third hour alongside Natalie Morales and Al Roker. In that role, she substituted as news anchor and main co-host and appeared as the chief legal analyst across all NBC platforms. Guthrie ceased to be the third-hour co-host and chief legal analyst in 2012 when she replaced Ann Curry as co-anchor of Today.

Early life and education
Savannah Clark Guthrie, named for her great-grandmother, was born in Melbourne, Australia, where her father was stationed for work. Her family returned to the United States and moved to Tucson, Arizona, two years later.  The first time Guthrie returned to Australia was in 2015 while working for Today, which she described as a "lifelong dream" of hers. 

She made the trip with her mother, Nancy, to visit her birthplace at the Maternity Ward of Sandringham Hospital in Sandringham, Victoria, an affluent beachside town located 16 km (10 mi) southeast of Melbourne's central business district. They then visited the family’s former home nearby Beaumaris. Guthrie also spent some time in Sydney before returning to the United States.

She graduated from Amphitheater High School in Tucson.

Guthrie received a B.A. in journalism from the University of Arizona, graduating cum laude in 1993. She was a member of the Arizona Alpha chapter of Pi Beta Phi.

Guthrie received a Juris Doctor from Georgetown University Law Center, where she graduated magna cum laude in 2002.

Career
Guthrie's first job in broadcasting was at ABC affiliate KMIZ, in Columbia, Missouri, where she worked for two years before returning to Tucson and a job with NBC affiliate KVOA in 1995. After five years in Arizona, she took a job at WRC-TV, Washington, D.C. where she covered major stories, including the September 11 attack on The Pentagon and the 2001 anthrax attacks.

After working several years as a broadcast journalist, Guthrie chose to resume her higher education, receiving a Juris Doctor from Georgetown University Law Center, where she graduated magna cum laude in 2002. She is a member of the bars of the District of Columbia and Arizona, having scored first place on the Arizona Bar Exam. She also was a member of Order of the Coif and received the International Academy of Trial Lawyers' Student Advocacy award for her work with victims of domestic violence.

Guthrie worked for the law firm Akin Gump Strauss Hauer & Feld, where she served as a litigation associate, specializing in white-collar criminal defense. In 2004, she became a national trial correspondent for CourtTV. Guthrie covered high-profile legal proceedings, including the Senate Judiciary Committee confirmation hearings of U.S. Supreme Court nominee Samuel Alito, the abduction and murder trial of Carlie Brucia, the Martha Stewart case, and the Michael Jackson trial.

NBC News (2007–present)
Guthrie became a correspondent for NBC News in September 2007. She covered Sarah Palin's 2008 vice-presidential race from Fairbanks, Pittsburgh, San Antonio, Sioux City, Iowa, and Washington. On December 18, she was named a White House correspondent for NBC News. In this capacity, she contributed to all NBC News properties. Guthrie is also an NBC News anchor and substitute anchor on NBC Nightly News.

On October 14, 2020, Guthrie served as moderator for the town hall scheduled by President Trump after he caught COVID-19 and refused to participate in a virtual presidential debate that was postponed for safety reasons, when Joe Biden scheduled a solo town hall debate, Trump and NBC scheduled one at the same date and time as Biden's town hall.

The Today Show (2011–present)

After Guthrie substituted for both Meredith Vieira and Ann Curry on Today, it was confirmed on May 9, 2011 that she would become co-host of the 9 a.m. hour alongside Natalie Morales and Al Roker, and the show's Chief Legal Editor. The move came after Vieira announced her departure from the show as co-host of the main program, and the subsequent promotions of Curry and Morales to main co-host and news anchor, respectively. Guthrie departed The Daily Rundown for Today on June 9, 2011, at which time she was appointed NBC News chief legal analyst, making her first appearance in this role on May 25, 2011. On June 29, 2012, it was announced that Guthrie would co-anchor Today, replacing Curry. Her first day as co-anchor alongside Matt Lauer was on July 9, 2012.

In 2011, she conducted an interview with Donald Trump in which he discussed his role in the Barack Obama "birther" controversy. Later that year, she interviewed Conrad Murray after he was found guilty of involuntary manslaughter in the death of Michael Jackson. She reported exclusive details on the death of Osama bin Laden. On November 29, 2017, Guthrie succeeded Matt Lauer as host alongside Hoda Kotb, after Lauer’s longstanding practice of sexual assault & harassment of young women colleagues became public.

Since 2012, she has hosted the Macy's Thanksgiving Day Parade on NBC and the annual Rockefeller Center Christmas tree lighting.

In 2020, she conducted another interview with then-President Donald Trump during his re-election campaign in the 2020 election amidst the COVID-19 pandemic. Guthrie pressed him on issues of his debts, coronavirus response and refusal to outright condemn the right-wing conspiracy theory of QAnon. Guthrie received praise for this interview, and many said that this encounter with a journalist marked the first time Trump was not allowed to dominate and make claims unchallenged during the 2020 election campaign, unlike his interviews with more conservative outlets like Fox News.

Guthrie was included in Time's list of 100 most influential people of 2018.

Other work
Guthrie was a commentator in the first four episodes of season one of truTV Presents: World's Dumbest....

Guthrie appeared as herself in the 2013 series finale of the NBC sitcom 30 Rock and the 2015 film Sharknado 3: Oh Hell No!.

In 2018, she played alongside compatriot Jack Sock in an exhibition tennis match against Swiss Roger Federer and American Bill Gates. Savannah and Jack suffered a loss, the final score being 3–6.

Guthrie is the author of two children's books: Princesses Wear Pants and Princesses Save the World.

In February 2021, Guthrie was announced to be an interim guest host of Jeopardy! following the death of host Alex Trebek. Her episodes aired June 14–25, 2021.

Personal life

Marriage and family
In December 2005, Guthrie married  English-born BBC News presenter Mark Orchard, whom she met while covering the trial of Michael Jackson. The couple divorced in 2009.

In late 2009, she began a relationship with Democratic political and communications consultant Michael Feldman while  vacationing in the Turks and Caicos Islands. In 2013, they became engaged. They married on March 15, 2014, in Tucson, Arizona.  Two days later, Guthrie announced she was four months pregnant.

Guthrie gave birth to their first child in 2014. On June 7, 2016, Guthrie announced she and her husband were expecting their second child. She gave birth to their second child in 2016.

Health
Recently, Guthrie has tested positive for COVID-19 three times; for example: On January 10, 2022, it was announced that Guthrie has tested positive for COVID-19 Deltacron hybrid variant for a first time, stating on the air that she has "little sniffs and not much more than that." Guthrie's diagnosis came one week after her Today co-host Hoda Kotb also tested positive for the hybrid variant as well. On May 6, 2022 during the endemic phase, she has first tested positive for COVID-19 Omicron variant for a second time, saying "I feel great. Honestly, I'm going to be back tomorrow. I just had a little cold, so I was really lucky with it." during a video call on May 10 on Today. On February 28, 2023, Guthrie has also second tested positive for COVID-19 Omicron variant for a third time, leaving the show around 7:30 a.m. after she wasn't feeling great and taking a test.

See also
 New Yorkers in journalism

References

External links

 Official NBC bio
 

1971 births
Living people
American television hosts
American television reporters and correspondents
American women lawyers
American women television journalists
Georgetown University Law Center alumni
Lawyers from Tucson, Arizona
NBC News people
Television personalities from Arizona
Television personalities from Melbourne
University of Arizona alumni
American women television presenters
21st-century American women
Jeopardy!